Adam Laurence "Addie" Adamson  (10 March 1884 – 21 July 1984) was a New Zealand businessman, accountant and local politician. He served as mayor of Invercargill from 1953 to 1962.

Early life
Born in Pahia in Western Southland, he was educated at Pahia School and Southland Boys' High School. He was born without a right hand. He worked on offices and ran general stores in Tuatapere and Orepuke with his brother Harry before becoming a partner in the firm of Featherston, Adamson and Francis, Accountants and Secretarial Services. He also had a small farm at Tuatapere.

Political career 
He was a city councillor from 1944 for nine years, then was mayor from 1953 to 1962. He was elected president of the New Zealand Municipal Association in 1960.

In the 1956 New Year Honours, Adamson was appointed an Officer of the Order of the British Empire, in recognition of his service as mayor.

Personal life and death 
He married Alice Harrington in 1922. He was a Presbyterian Church elder. He drove a car until he was 99, and spoke at a formal dinner two nights before he died.

References

1884 births
1984 deaths
20th-century New Zealand politicians
New Zealand politicians with disabilities
Invercargill City Councillors
Mayors of Invercargill
20th-century New Zealand businesspeople
New Zealand accountants
New Zealand Officers of the Order of the British Empire
People educated at Southland Boys' High School
New Zealand centenarians
Men centenarians
Burials at Southland Crematorium